Gisela Colon (born 1966) is an American international contemporary artist who has developed a unique vocabulary of Organic Minimalism,  breathing lifelike qualities into reductive forms. Operating at the intersection of art and science, Colon is best known for meticulously creating light-activated sculptures through industrial and technological processes. Drawing from aerospace and other scientific realms, Colon utilizes innovative sculptural materials such as carbon fiber and optical materials of the 21st century, to generate her energetic sculptures. Colon's gender-fluid sculptures disrupt the traditional view of the masculine minimal object, by embodying qualities of energy, movement and growth, through a merger of industrial with the organic.

Colon has exhibited internationally throughout the United States, Europe, and the Middle East. Originally from San Juan Puerto Rico, but currently living and working in Los Angeles, California, Colon creates work that is the product of cross-cultural influences, fusing characteristics of Minimalism, Light and Space, Finish Fetish, Op Art, and Kinetic Art.

Colon is one of the few women working in the Light and Space and Finish/Fetish movements. Recognized as a successor and legatee of California Minimalism and the Light and Space movements, Colon has exhibited her work alongside veterans of these movements such as Robert Irwin, Larry Bell, DeWain Valentine, Peter Alexander, Helen Pashgian and Mary Corse. Her use of color, shapes and internal layering is considered "assertively feminist,"  and "grounded in Minimalism." Her work has been compared to earlier male artists like Craig Kaufman, Dewain Valentine, Doug Wheeler, and Peter Alexander for her use of materials and light as medium; however, as pointed out in ArtForum, "Colon's labors are very much her own...Her employ of industrial materials and techniques thus structurally redoubles an earlier industry-driven technophilia, even as she eschews her predecessor's penchant for outsourcing production."

Early life and education
Colon was born in Vancouver, Canada, in 1966 to a German mother and Puerto Rican father. Her mother was a painter who studied languages and art at the University of Alberta in Edmonton, and her father was a scientist who obtained a Ph.D. in Chemistry from the Simon Fraser University, Vancouver. She was raised in San Juan, Puerto Rico since the age of one, and attended the University of Puerto Rico, graduating magna cum laude in 1987 with a B.A. in Economics, after receiving a 1986 Congressional Scholarship Award by the Harry S. Truman Foundation. Colon moved to Los Angeles in 1987 to pursue graduate studies, receiving a Juris Doctor degree from the Southwestern University School of Law in 1990.

Early work
Colon began her career as a painter, exhibiting abstract works from 2005 through 2011. Colon's early influence included Carlos Cruz-Diez and Jesus Rafael Soto, amongst others. Her paintings also showed the influence of artists associated with "Light and Space" in Los Angeles such as Ron Davis and Craig Kauffman. In 2012, Colon moved away from painting into sculpture, focusing on perceptual phenomena, an interest she shares with other members of the Los Angeles-based Light and Space movement. Colon's friendship with mentor De Wain Valentine, and the writings of Donald Judd and Robert Irwin, generated a shift in her work increasing towards issues of visual perception and materiality, which led to the creation of her sculptural body of work.

Organic Minimalism
Organic Minimalism is a term of art coined in 2018 by Colón to describe her artistic practice of imbuing organic lifelike qualities into a vocabulary of minimal reductive forms, expanding and deconstructing the traditional male-dominated canon of minimalism and Light and Space. Colón defines Organic Minimalism as a visual and sensory artistic practice that generates perceptual experiences through a reductive vocabulary of forms that embody organic lifelike qualities of energy, movement, change, growth, transformation, evolution, gravity, and time, emanating radiant energy sourced from the Earth and beyond, becoming conduits of transmutation, transformation, and enlightenment. The practice of Organic Minimalism is said to draw raw energy from visible and invisible worlds, incorporating as materia prima the laws of physics, the intrinsic life force emanating from planet Earth, the powerful generative forces radiating throughout the cosmological realm, and the sublime mysteries of the quantum universe beyond.

Colón first presented this art manifesto in a public lecture in 2018; Organic Minimalism as the theoretical foundation of this artistic practice began as early as 2012.

Work
Colon's oeuvre encompasses several distinct sculptural forms: Pods, Monoliths, Slabs, Light Portals, and Unidentified Objects. The through-line in all of Colon's work is the concept of the "mutable object." Influenced by Donald Judd's ideas and writings, such as his seminal essay "Specific Objects" (1964, published 1965),  Colon refers to her works as "non-specific objects" to highlight their deliberate fluid indeterminacy. The sculptures are conceived as "non-specific objects" that transmute their physical qualities through fluctuating movement, varied lighting, changing environmental conditions, and the passage of time.

Pods 
Colon produces incandescent sculptures generally referred to as "Pods." In 2012 Colon began working with plastics, developing a unique fabrication process of blow-molding and layering various acrylic materials. This industrial process creates dynamic sculptures that fluctuate in appearance, emanating light and color inherently from within. The Pods shift color and form before the viewers' eyes depending on lighting, and the viewers' choice of location. 

Christopher Knight, art critic for the LA Times writes, "Sleek sculptural objects with misty, mercurial surfaces and at least partial inspiration from aerospace technology have not lost their appeal in more than half a century. In Los Angeles, first there was Craig Kauffman, then Helen Pashgian and now Gisela Colon…..Colon's wall-bound " pods" [are created] in a variety of whimsical, organic shapes — lozenges, softened trapezoids and freeform globules — as if conceived with a kid's giant bubble wand. Most sport a multicolored nucleus made from layers of colored plastics, which glows brightly if mysteriously within the paler milky form."

In describing Colon's work in the historical context of California Minimalism and Light & Space movements, critic Dr. Suzanne Hudson states, "Colon's 'Glo-Pods,' 2013—, irregularly shaped wall mounted acrylic orbs, recall the languid organicism of Craig Kauffman's candy-colored bubbles; their intimation of light emanating from within the impossibly smooth contours additionally channels Helen Pashgian's illuminated monoliths.  Unlike Pashgian's plinths, or Doug Wheeler's neon-backlit canvases, Colon's scarab-like objects achieve their iridescence via the play of natural light, yet the sculptures appear to change color as one moves around them, as if lit by multihued bulbs.Perhaps more to the broader point, Colon's labors are very much her own…"

Art critic Mat Gleason explained: "Rather than have some technological trick embedded into the art, [Colon] has made objects that are altered by the world around them yet never stop being themselves. This artist has thus delivered a meditation on the flexibility of the feminine as antidote to the rigidity of the masculine."

Critic Steven Biller has stated that: "Without question, Colon's approach to shaping, forming, and coloring is advancing the trajectory of the resurgent Light and Space / Finish Fetish movement."

In her essay "Notes, Thoughts, Observations Towards the Development, Conceptualization and Creation of Non-Specific Objects,"  Colon refers to her plastic sculptures "non-specific objects," further explaining, that "Non-Specificity [is] a quality brought about by the inherent mutability of the object."

Art writer and biographer Hunter Drohojowska-Philp describes this phenomenon: "When the most recent iterations of the Glo-Pods are mounted on a white wall, the 'inherent mutability,' so desired as an effect by Colon, is indisputable. Depending on the combination of artificial and natural lighting, the colors slip and slide like an oil slick on water. Further alterations are apparent as a viewer approaches the work. Among the many shifts, in a single work, pale aqua can turn to lavender and appear to melt within the form. At close proximity, the focus shifts to the frosty surface, as though one were looking through a white cocoon to the pupa within. At a greater distance, the pupa can seem to vibrate with the growing intensity of its perceived colors. There is no there, there: no singular location in which one can grasp all the implications of a single work."

Monoliths 

Colon creates large-scale floor-based sculptures called "Monoliths," 12-foot tall vertical singular-form sculptures, engineered with aerospace technology, possessing no lines, corners, edges, or demarcations, conceived as pure form to denote clarity and aesthetic purity. The Monoliths have "allusive shimmering surfaces" that have been described as "phallic shaped pieces," "ambiguous works that defy categorization. The pieces have a presence and a resonance, and Colon succeeds in fashioning unsolvable optical illusions that inspire wonder far beyond their formal properties."
Representing a new direction for Colon, the Monolith sculptures are 12-foot-tall iridescent pillars that "succeed in providing viewers with a dramatic perceptual experience...Radiant, elegant and pristine, [they] manage to be both strong and sensuous.

The first Monolith of this series, created in 2016, is in the permanent collection of the Los Angeles County Museum of Art (LACMA).

In 2017 Colon created the Parabolic Monolith, a monumental sculptural form towering 15 feet high, described by art critic Christopher Knight, "like the flattened nose-cones of an airplane or science-fiction starship….Undeniably eye-catching, these giant luxury objects press technological craftsmanship to an extreme degree."

Slabs 

In 2017 Colon developed a series of standing sculptures referred to as "Light Slabs," 8-feet tall works with a light-activated core rendered in translucent acrylic and polished stainless steel. The combination of disparate materials creates a duality of perceptual phenomena. The Slabs have been described as "sublime sculptures that resonate with color and light. Mysterious and magical…. they emit, reflect and refract light…feel otherworldly and seems to emanate a powerful life force. The metallic colors shift as the viewer circles it, much like the wall pods mutate in response to shifting points of view or changes in the light….These works aspire to be the opposite of fixed and static; they are shape-shifting, non-linear, non-specific objects. Working from a vocabulary of minimalist geometric forms, Colon achieves glowing, timeless objects of beauty."

Light Portals 

In 2020, Colon exhibited a series of linear wall sculptures titled Light Portals, presenting swaths of structural color that shift and refract depending on the variability of external light conditions and the position of the viewer.

Unidentified Objects 

In 2020, Colon created Unidentified Objects, a body of work referencing cosmological origins and universal forces such as matter, energy, gravity, space and time.

Museum exhibitions

Colon's work has been presented in several institutional surveys and thematic exhibitions such as: "Brave New Worlds: Explorations of Space," Palm Springs Art Museum, Palm Springs, California, 2019; "California Connections: Selections from the Museum of Contemporary Art San Diego," The California Center for the Arts Museum, Escondido, California, 2017; "Plastic Entanglements: Ecology, Aesthetics, Materials," Smith College Museum of Art, Northampton, Massachusetts, 2019, "California Dreaming: Contemporary Art From the Weisman Foundation," Fredrick R. Weisman Museum of Art, Pepperdine University, Malibu, California, 2017; "Crystals in Art: Ancient to Today," Crystal Bridges Museum of American Art, Bentonville, Arkansas, 2019; and will be included in "Light, Space, Surface: Southern California Art From LACMA'S Collection," Frist Art Museum, traveling to Addison Gallery of American Art, Andover, Massachusetts, and The Ringling Museum of Art, Sarasota, Florida, 2021–2022.

Land art

Colon participated in the Land Art Biennial, Desert X, for its 2020 iteration located in AlUla, Saudi Arabia. Her site-specific project titled "The Future is Now," consisted of "a silver-bullet-like obelisk— curvy and  iridescent on one side and, where the sun couldn’t shine, flatter and gray— represented the rare perfect fusion of art and setting."

At Regent’s Park in London, Colon [as Colón] embedded a 25-foot (7.6 meter) tall monolith, Quantum Shift (Parabolic Monolith Sirius Titanium), 2021, responsive to the environment of the UK, with a surface finish that activated in cloudy weather. Writing in The Art Newspaper, Anny Shaw remarks, “Linked to the Californian Light and Space movement as well as the land artists of the 1960s and 1970s, Colón views her role as ‘disruptor and challenger of the past canon where, traditionally, men created aggressive gestures, which were sometimes destructive towards the Earth’. By appropriating traditionally ‘male-associated’ forms such as the phallus, bullets, missiles and rockets, and rendering them as ambiguous objects, Colón says she ‘subverts a complex framework of deeply held cultural semiotics’.” 

In 2021 as part of a historic international exhibition at the 4500-year-old UNESCO site of the Pyramids of Giza in Cairo, Egypt, Colón installed a site-specific work, Eternity Now (Ellipsoidal Dome Gold Iridium) informed by the ancient Egyptians’ advancements in astronomy, science, art, architecture, mythology, and sacred geometries. Resembling a glowing sun, the 30-foot (9 meter) long sculpture created of aerospace-grade carbon fiber, laid at the foot of the Sphinx and the Pyramids activating a direct dialogue across time with its historic and cultural surroundings. Through semiotics and the embodiment of a universal geometric language, the installation envisioned a future of humanistic solidarity and unity.

Collections

Colon's works are held in the permanent collections of institutions such as the Los Angeles County Museum of Art; Perez Art Museum Miami; Museum of Contemporary Art San Diego; Butler Institute of American Art; Palm Springs Art Museum; and Frederick R. Weisman Art Foundation, among others.

References

External links
 Official website

20th-century American sculptors
Minimalist artists
1966 births
Living people
University of Puerto Rico alumni
Southwestern Law School alumni
American women sculptors
People from San Juan, Puerto Rico
21st-century American women artists
Land artists
21st-century American sculptors